Kami-Con is an annual three-day anime convention held during January or February in Birmingham, Alabama at the Birmingham–Jefferson Convention Complex by the Bama SOS Brigade, a student organization from the University of Alabama.

Programming
The convention typically offers anime screenings, concerts, cosplay contests, dodgeball tournaments, a Pokecenter, rave, tabletop games, vendors, and video game tournaments. The convention contains a storyline/plot, which allows attendees to pick sides, and affect the outcome of the story by participating in various contests.

History
Kami-Con is organized by the Bama SOS Brigade, which was started by Raymond Lenzner and a handful of students at the University of Alabama. Construction in the Ferguson Center during the 2010 convention caused some events such as video gaming to change locations. The convention moved to the Birmingham–Jefferson Convention Complex in 2013. Kami-Con 2021 was cancelled due to the COVID-19 pandemic. The 2022 convention had COVID-19 policies that required masks and either vaccination or a negative test.

Event history

Mascots
The official mascots of Kami-Con are Shio-chan (light/shiny) and Kosho (dark), who battled with the help of convention attendees choosing sides and participating in contests, to decide 2011's mascot. In 2013, Shio and Kosho battled with the new turtle mascot, Shoyu, and its previous evil owners.

Mississippi Anime Invasion 
The Mississippi Anime Invasion was a two-day anime convention held during October at the Oxford Conference Center in Oxford, Mississippi. It was created by Kami-Con and students from the University of Mississippi.

Event history

Gallery

References

External links
Kami-Con Website

Anime conventions in the United States
Recurring events established in 2009
2009 establishments in Alabama
Annual events in Alabama
Conventions in Alabama
Culture of Birmingham, Alabama
Tourist attractions in Birmingham, Alabama
Events in Birmingham, Alabama